Zoran Cvetković (born 16 December 1976) is a former Serbian footballer who played as a defender.

Cvetković has previously played for Kastoria F.C. in the Greek Beta Ethniki and Vihren Sandanski in the Bulgarian A PFG.

References

1976 births
Living people
Serbian footballers
Serbian expatriate footballers
FK Obilić players
Panserraikos F.C. players
Kastoria F.C. players
OFC Vihren Sandanski players
Turan-Tovuz IK players
PFC Lokomotiv Mezdra players
First Professional Football League (Bulgaria) players
Serbian expatriate sportspeople in Bulgaria
Expatriate footballers in Bulgaria
Sportspeople from Niš
Association football defenders